Bronisław Seichter (12 July 1902 – 30 September 1965) was a Polish footballer. He played in two matches for the Poland national football team from 1928 to 1930.

References

External links
 

1902 births
1965 deaths
Polish footballers
Poland international footballers
Place of birth missing
Association footballers not categorized by position